The 1976 Delaware State Hornets football team represented Delaware State College—now known as Delaware State University—as a member of the Mid-Eastern Athletic Conference (MEAC) in the 1976 NCAA Division II football season. Led by second-year head coach Ed Wyche, the Hornets compiled an overall record of 3–7–1 and a mark of 1–5 in conference play, placing sixth out of seven teams in the MEAC.

Schedule

References

Delaware State
Delaware State Hornets football seasons
Delaware State Hornets football